The Terrebonne City Council (in French: Le conseil municipal de Terrebonne) is the governing body for the mayor–council government in the city of Terrebonne, Quebec in the Lanaudière region. The council consists of the mayor and 16 councillors.

Current Terrebonne City Council 
Elected in the 2017 municipal elections

References

External links 
 Terrebonne City Council 

Municipal councils in Quebec
Terrebonne, Quebec